Nicolaes van Gelder or Claes Gelder (1636 – 1676) was a Dutch Golden Age painter.

He was born in Leiden and became a pupil of Pieter de Ring. He is known for still life paintings.

Gelder worked in Stockholm in 1661 and Copenhagen in 1673 (where his daughter was born) but died in Amsterdam. His wife was mentioned in Amsterdam in 1677 as a widow.

References

1636 births
1676 deaths
Artists from Leiden
Dutch Golden Age painters
Dutch male painters